The International Association of the Congo, also known as the International Congo Society, was an association founded on 17 November 1879 by Leopold II of Belgium to further his interests in the Congo.  It replaced the Belgian  ("Committee for the Study of the Upper Congo"), which was part of the International African Association front organisation created for the exploitation of the Congo. The goals of the International Congo Society was to establish control of the Congo Basin and to exploit its economic resources. The Berlin Conference recognised the society as sovereign over the territories it controlled and on August 1, 1885, i.e. four and half months after the closure of the Berlin Conference, King Leopold's Vice-Administrator General in the Congo, announced that the society and the territories it occupied were henceforth called "the Congo Free State".

Ownership and control
The official stockholders of the Committee for the Study of the Upper Congo were Dutch and British businessmen and a Belgian banker who was holding shares on behalf of Leopold. Colonel Maximilien Strauch, president of the committee, was an appointee of Leopold. It was not made clear to Henry Morton Stanley, who signed a five-year contract to establish bases in the Congo in 1878, whether he was working for the International African Association, the Committee for Study of the Upper Congo, or Leopold himself. Stanley's European employee contracts forbade disclosure of the true nature of their work.

Berlin Conference

The Berlin Conference or Congo Conference of 1884–85 regulated European colonisation and trade in Africa. King Leopold II was able to convince the powers at the conference that common trade in Africa was in the best interests of all countries. The General Act of the conference divided Africa between the main powers of Europe and confirmed the territory controlled by the Congo Society as its private property, which essentially made it the property of Leopold II.

On 10 April 1884 the United States Senate authorised President Chester A. Arthur "to recognize the flag of the AIC as the equal of that of an allied government". On 8 November 1884 Germany recognised the sovereignty of the society over the Congo.

See also
 Corporatocracy
Brussels Anti-Slavery Conference 1889–90
Brussels Conference Act of 1890
Royal Museum for Central Africa

External links
Timeline for Congo — History Commons

References

 
 
Belgian colonisation in Africa
Former Belgian colonies
Former colonies in Africa
History of Central Africa
History of the Democratic Republic of the Congo
Political history of the Democratic Republic of the Congo
States and territories established in 1879
States and territories disestablished in 1885
1879 establishments in Africa
1885 disestablishments in Africa
Leopold II of Belgium
Belgium–Democratic Republic of the Congo relations